Richard Naramana was the fifth Anglican Bishop of Ysabel, one of the nine dioceses that make up the Anglican Church of Melanesia. He was consecrated and installed on 18 April 2004; and retired  in September 2015.

References

Living people
21st-century Anglican bishops in Oceania
Anglican bishops of Ysabel
Year of birth missing (living people)